On Cinema (also called On Cinema at the Cinema and On Cinema! and More in the Morning for the video series) is an American comedy web series and podcast starring Tim Heidecker and Gregg Turkington. The duo appear, using their own names, as a pair of hapless movie reviewers to promote new film releases. The show started as an independently released podcast from 2011 to 2013, before being picked up as a professionally produced web video series by Thing X in 2012, continuing after the site merged with Adult Swim's website in 2013. The show moved to HEI Network, an independent service, in 2021, with funding given by user subscriptions and special event ticket purchases.

On Cinema at the Cinema is the hub of a 'fictional universe' that includes the podcast, 13 seasons of the video series, yearly live Oscar specials, a spin-off limited series entitled "The Trial", the spin-off series Decker, a movie review app, an On Cinema Live! tour, and a film entitled Mister America.

On Cinema also features a myriad of guest actors, some of whom play fictionalized versions of themselves, most notably Joe Estevez and Mark Proksch. The show and fictional universe have a dedicated cult following of fans who play along with the storylines via social media, often taking sides as "Timheads" or "Greggheads", or "Unityheads" for those that do not take a side. Heidecker and Turkington also started Decker-Con, where they appear in character and interact with fans.

Premise
Early podcast episodes of On Cinema were usually no longer than one or two minutes. Heidecker and Turkington would "review" films without actually providing any meaningful information or critical insight. With the video series, Tim and Gregg start using a rating scale of "bags of popcorn" ranging from 0–5. While Gregg respects the limit of five, Tim often goes overboard giving "6 bags" or dozens more, creating tension and confusion throughout the show. Almost every film gets a score of "5 bags"—known as a 'five-bagger'—or higher from both reviewers.

Although reviewing films remains the central conceit, the focus of the series quickly shifted from a mockery of amateur podcasting and YouTube criticism to an extended, improvisational character study of the duo. Heidecker frequently uses his time on camera to discuss anything on his character's mind except film, or to simply berate and belittle Turkington. Turkington's character fancies himself a "film expert," his only qualification being an enormous collection of forgettable mainstream films from the 1980s and 1990s on VHS.

The series continues to provide reviews that purposely offer no real critical insight. Later seasons have seen Tim lose interest in reviewing movies, instead creating a TV show, Decker, and starting a rock band, Dekkar. The scale of events has increased dramatically as the show has progressed, with both Tim and Gregg causing deaths and injuries, mainly indirectly.

Major characters

Tim Heidecker 
Played by Tim Heidecker as a fictionalized version of himself, Tim is the creator and host of On Cinema. Despite being host, he appears to know very little about the films he is discussing, although he is an avid fan of Tom Cruise and Jack Reacher. Tim often uses his show to discuss his far-right conservative views and personal problems, or to promote his other projects, like his action series Decker, his book Hog Shots, his band Dekkar, his company HEI Inc., and other programs on the HEI Network. Tim is an aggressive egomaniacal alcoholic, constantly drinking during the Oscar specials, and often promoted alternative medicine with his doctor, Dr. Luther Sanchez, taking a stance against vaccination and promoting a "nutritional vape system" that is filled with illegal drugs. The vape system eventually results in the death of 20 people at the Electric Sun Desert Music Festival ran by Tim, resulting in his arrest for felony murder and the events of The Trial, where a mistrial was declared and Tim was let free. After the trial, Tim runs an unsuccessful campaign for District Attorney of San Bernardino against the trial's prosecutor, Vincent Rosetti, as depicted in Mister America. Other crimes that Tim has committed in the series include property damage, arson, break-ins, and attempted suicide/homicide.

Tim has faced multiple family problems throughout the show. Tim has an estranged teenage son from his first marriage, which ended after he underwent brain surgery. He then met Ayaka while she was staying with his family as a foreign exchange student. The two hook up and eventually marry, birthing a child named Tom Cruise Jr. Heidecker. Tom Cruise Jr. died shortly after birth after Tim refused to have him vaccinated, and his death led to their marriage rapidly spiraling apart. After they divorced, Tim married Juliana, the sister of fellow Dekkar band member Axiom, which was short-lived. Tim then began a relationship with Toni Newman, the sole juror who refused to find Tim guilty and Tim's aide for his political campaign. They married twice, but following an affair and a trip to rehab, a newly sober Toni divorced Tim.

Gregg Turkington
Played by Gregg Turkington as a fictionalized version of himself, Gregg is a frequent guest of On Cinema, sometimes acting as host when Tim is away. Gregg is a film buff and self-described movie expert, despite his obvious lack of critical insight, and believes that On Cinema should be devoted exclusively to film criticism. Gregg has an extensive collection of VHS cassettes located in Victorville, California which he refers to as the Victorville Film Archives, boasting that it's one of the largest film archives in America, though its exact size is unknown and has been destroyed on multiple occasions by Tim. Gregg's favorite film is The Hobbit. He describes himself as a "Hobbithead" and campaigned every year for the Academy Awards to recognize Peter Jackson and give the Best Picture award to The Hobbit trilogy, believing that the Academy has "a write-in section". Gregg produces many of the show's recurring segments, including "Popcorn Classics" and "On Cinema On Location", and plays Special Agent Jonathan Kington on Decker. Despite his clear antipathy towards Tim, as well as the constant abuse he suffers under him, Gregg repeatedly returns to On Cinema in the hopes that he will be made co-host.

Almost nothing is known about Gregg's personal life. He is mainly quiet and withdrawn, actively avoiding confrontation, redirecting almost every conversation into a movie reference and regarding real-world events and documentary films as pointless distractions. Though not as openly hostile as Tim, Gregg is often stubborn and passive-aggressive, insisting on his incorrect knowledge when challenged and quietly criticizing Tim when he steals the limelight. As the series progresses, Gregg has shown himself to be almost as sociopathic as Tim, storing a comatose Mark Proksch in his apartment, denying him access to medical treatment and eventually using him as a "Living Oscar" statue prop. Gregg also leaves his car running in the studio during the seventh Oscar special, causing a toxic buildup of carbon monoxide that knocks the entire studio unconscious and kills two. After being confronted with evidence of the poisoning, Gregg runs over Tim's bodyguard, Michael "LaRue" Matthews, in the eighth Oscar special.

Recurring characters

 Joe Estevez: Joe is a prolific actor and close friend of both Tim and Gregg and the second most regular guest on On Cinema. He portrays President Davidson and President Davidson Jr. on Decker. He is often friendly and forbearing, and often helps both Tim and Gregg out with their projects and personal problems. He staged Tim's intervention in season 8 and was the only person to visit him while in jail in season 9. He was briefly the CFO of HEI Inc. twice, although both times Tim scolded him for incompetence. He forgave Joe for this in season 13, only to retract it after Joe was caught starring in an ad for a class action lawsuit regarding the Electric Sun Festival. Joe later denounced the ad.
 Mark Proksch: Mark is an aspiring comedian and impersonator, having been hired by Tim and Gregg to do impersonations of famous actors, such as W.C. Fields, Charlie Chaplin, and the Three Stooges, for the Oscar specials. He also played various roles in Decker, most notably the terrorist Abdul. Later, he became an usher at the Victorville Film Center and a waiter at Six Bag Cinemas. Mark is a poor impressionist, doing a similar voice for every impression. He faces verbal and physical abuse from Tim and later Gregg, and winds up falling into a coma in the fifth Oscar special after being locked up in a scuba suit. Gregg kept the comatose Mark in his apartment and used him as a prop Oscar statue in the sixth Oscar special. Tim accidentally resuscitates him by knocking him over, sustaining some form of brain damage that leaves him quiet and docile. He is later arrested for selling Gregg's pirated VHS cassettes, assaulted in custody, and falls into another coma. Mark later cuts ties, but winds up returning at Tim's behest in season 12, only to be hospitalized again during the ninth Oscar special. He starred in a college film, Baboon, that Tim later announced they would redevelop into a film for HEI Network.
 Ayaka Ohwaki: Ayaka was a foreign exchange student who stayed with Tim's family. She dated Tim briefly before being deported back to Japan, giving birth to their son, Tom Cruise Jr. They later reunited after a heartfelt plea by Tim during an episode. During Tim's trial, Ayaka testified and called Tim a cold, abusive husband and revealed that Tim forced her to abort their second child. This ended their relationship, and Ayaka returned to Japan and married a new husband.
 Dr. Luther Sanchez (portrayed by Zac Holtzman): Commonly referred to as "Dr. San", he was a practitioner of alternative medicine, serving first as Tim's acupuncturist and later as his family physician with the birth of Tom Cruise Jr. A con-man, Dr. San tricked Tim out of large sums of money for sub-standard acupuncture with dirty needles, convinced him not to vaccinate his child, and provided him with toxic vape pens that resulted in the death of 20 people at Tim's music festival. He was arrested along with Tim and committed suicide while in custody.
 Tom Cruise Jr. Heidecker (portrayed by an unknown child actor): Tim and Ayaka's son, named after Tim's favorite actor Tom Cruise. He died of an undisclosed illness after his father, under the supervision of Dr. San, refused to vaccinate him. Tim hotly contests this, claiming that Tom Cruise Jr.'s death was caused by a fatal buildup of black mold at Gregg's beach house. Tim later 'resurrects' Tom Cruise Jr. as a fully-grown CGI mannequin on both the fourth and seventh Oscar specials, with 'Tom' taking a stance against vaccination like his father.
 Alessandro "Axiom" Serradimigni: Axiom is a guitar player who became the second member of Dekkar after meeting Tim at Guitar Center. Loyal to Tim, Axiom at one point donates his hand to Tim via a hand transplant. At Tim's trial, it is revealed that he originally wrote the song that became Tim's "Empty Bottle", despite not being given a writing credit. Axiom briefly cut ties with Tim and Manuel after Tim dissolves Dekkar, only to return at Tim's wedding, saving the unconscious guests from carbon monoxide poisoning and reuniting the band. Axiom is then kicked out by Tim after Toni has an affair with Axiom, although they then reunite once more in the Wendy Kerby Valentine's Day Special. He is blinded when Tim crashes the VFA Tour Bus in season 13, though by the tenth Oscar special his sight returned. Upon finding out Tim crashed the bus in a suicide attempt, he and Manuel walk out. He has a sister, Julianna, who Tim was briefly married to.
 Manuel Giusti: Manuel is the third member of Dekkar, having joined in the fourth Oscar special. Overwhelmingly loyal to Tim, Manuel donates skin from his buttocks to repair Tim's burned face and perjured himself at Tim's trial by presenting a falsified suicide note that Tim wrote and had Manuel claim came from Dr. San. He has never cut ties with the band, throughout its multiple rebrands and new members. He is hospitalized when Tim crashes the VFA Tour Bus in season 13, and briefly forgets English.
 Toni Newman (portrayed by Terri Parks): Toni first appeared in Mister America as Tim's campaign manager for his district attorney campaign. Toni was the sole juror in Tim's trial who voted not guilty because she believed in his innocence, resulting in the mistrial. While Toni was more competent than Tim in some areas, she was often equally disorganized and didn't hesitate to employ illegal tactics to achieve her ends. She later joined HEI Inc. as the CFO. They married at the end of season 11 and again during the seventh Oscar Special. While drunk at her birthday party during season 12, Toni has an affair with Axiom, enraging Tim. She goes to rehab and later returns sober, revealing that she was constantly under the influence of alcohol the entire time she knew Tim, and admitting that she knew he was guilty. She then kicks Tim out of her house and files for divorce.
 Matt Newman (portrayed by Tobias Icasatti): Matt is Toni's son from a previous marriage. As a step-dad, Tim tried to bond with Matt in both the seventh and eighth Oscar special, mainly talking about video games. Matt doesn't show much love for Tim, and didn't give a toast at the wedding reception. Matt even messes with Tim, leading him to believe that Dr. San has been talking to him from beyond the grave.
 Michael "LaRue" Matthews: LaRue originally appeared as a bit actor from Decker, and was later hired by Tim as his bodyguard and private detective. Michael is a right-wing militant who believes in various conspiracies theories typically found on the Internet and is regularly sent by Tim on errands to obtain personal information on his supposed enemies. He's also a gun enthusiast, the host of Xposed on the HEI Network, and an amateur rapper that performed with Tim's band DEK4R. After Gregg runs him over during the eighth Oscar special, LaRue now uses an electric mobility aid vehicle.
 Edward Szymczyk (portrayed by Curtis Webster): Szymczyk was the presiding judge at Tim's murder trial. He had little patience for Tim's lack of decorum in the court room, and found Tim to be in contempt of court multiple times. After the case resulted in a mistrial, he retired.
 Vincent Rosetti (portrayed by Don Pecchia): Rosetti is the district attorney for San Bernardino County, California, and represented the prosecution in Tim's murder trial. Tim frequently disparaged him as "Rosetti the Rat" and eventually ran against him, although this campaign ended after Tim failed to get his name on the ballot.
 Hank Friedmann: Hank is an restaurateur who has ran many franchises seen catering the Oscar specials over the years. In the third special, he runs Chaplin's Chili, serving chef Tom Chaplin's chili. In the fourth special, he now runs Chaplin's Soup and Subs, having split from Tom Chaplin after the brand was acquired. In the fifth special, he runs Chaplin's X-press, now a gas station restaurant. In the sixth special, he runs QwikBite, having legally been forced to drop the Chaplin name. In the ninth special, he runs Tim's HEI Ranch Grub Shack. In the tenth special, he runs Tom's Original Chili and serves chili flavored popcorn that Gregg frequently criticizes through the special.
 Tom Chaplin (portrayed by Barry Agin): Chaplin is the namesake for Chaplin's Chili, but eventually split from the business and sued business partner Hank Friedmann. Through Foodman's Dream Catering, he caters Tim and Toni's wedding in the seventh Oscar special. He is one of two people to die of carbon monoxide poisoning at the end of the special. A tribute to him is shown in the eighth special.
 John Aprea: An actor best known for appearing on The Godfather Part II, John first appears on the first Oscar special and later serves as a guest host of On Cinema. He also appears on Decker as General Jeffrey Cotter. John tends to maintain a professional composure lacked by many of the other characters.
 James Dean (portrayed by Ralph Lucas): A famous actor that many believed died in 1955, until Gregg revealed in 2015 that he had faked his death, bringing him out as a guest in the third Oscar special. Tim refused to believe it was him and got Dr. San to perform a DNA test in the fourth Oscar special, which confirmed he was, in fact, James Dean. He plays Dracula on Decker.
 Wendy Kerby (portrayed by Jessica Ruth Bell): Wendy is a singer who frequents Tim and Toni's church and first appeared in the eighth Oscar special. She joins Tim's band, D4, replacing Axiom. She appears as co-host in the Wendy Kerby Valentines Day Special, but after an awkward attempt from Tim to stage a kiss between her and Manuel, she runs off set and doesn't return.
 G. Amato (portrayed by Carlos Barbouth): G. Amato is the owner of The Amato Group, which funds production of On Cinema from season 13 onward. He was introduced in the ninth Oscar special as the person with the most HEI Points. He acts similar to a mob leader and has been using Tim's HEI Ranch to mine its lithium. In the tenth Oscar special, he runs a near-impossible lottery with 10 balls where HEI Points holders had to spend points to get tickets. He also begins treating Tim like a "second son", which makes Tim start calling him "Dad".
 Kaili Amato (portrayed by Marie Gibeault): Kaili is the co-host of On Cinema season 13 and part of the Amato family. She provides updates on Hollywood gossip. She is a widow, after her husband, Chris Amato, was suspiciously killed. She appears in the tenth Oscar special, hosting the lottery segments and providing "Oscar Minute" segments that Gregg liked.

Series overview

Podcast
The On Cinema podcast was produced independently by Tim and Gregg. The podcast consists of Tim, along with Gregg as a "special guest" for every episode, covering movies poorly and with little insight, and often engaging in arguments. Gregg later developed a more pretentious "film buff" persona, and Tim took a turn to being obnoxiously political, sometimes devoting entire episodes to conspiracy theories, much to the chagrin of Gregg.

A running joke that was carried over to the video series is Gregg's confusion between Star Trek II: The Wrath of Khan and Star Trek IV: The Voyage Home, stubbornly insisting that Tim is the one with the movies reversed, rejecting any evidence to the contrary.

Season 1
The video series debuts on Thing X, a parody website created by Adult Swim, having changed its name to On Cinema at the Cinema. The series is similar to the podcast, taking place on a set meant to look like a movie theater. Gregg is still never acknowledged as more than a guest, and begins his recurring segments "Popcorn Classics", where he brings in forgotten VHS movies to showcase, and "On Cinema On Location", where he travels to filming locations of obscure movies, respectively.

Season 2
Tim reveals he has blood clotting in his brain but rejects surgery because of "side effects, the whole medical industry, and Obamacare", while Gregg pushes for him to get surgery. Late in the season, Tim introduces the first special guest other than Gregg: Ayaka Ohwaki, a foreign exchange student from Japan staying with Tim's family.

The first On Cinema Oscar Special airs, where Tim and Gregg livestream the Oscars and drink champagne. Tim gets very drunk and vomits on some of Gregg's VHS tapes which causes Gregg to walk off the set.

Season 3
Thing X merges with Adult Swim's website, and the series moves with it. The season begins with Tim in a head bandage and in pain, as he went through with the brain surgery, although his wife divorced him for this choice. Gregg begins his goal of watching "500 movies in 500 days", hoping to make the Guinness Book of World Records. Tim kicks Gregg off the show after Gregg drives all the way to San Francisco for an "On Location" segment, to rebuke Tim & (incorrectly) insist that San Francisco was the location of Star Trek II. John Aprea and Ayaka are guests on the next episode, where Tim reveals he is dating Ayaka. In the season finale, Gregg returns to the show as Ayaka was deported back to Japan.

Season 4
Tim begins season four with many health problems and introduces his personal doctor, Dr. San (Zac Holtzman), an alternative medical doctor treating Tim with "natural" remedies, including acupuncture. Dr. San begins coming onto the set with Tim, despite Gregg's objections. However, Tim's face becomes infected and he denounces Dr. San. Ayaka sends a letter to Tim on the show, announcing she is pregnant with Tim's child.

In the second Oscar Special, Tim and Gregg drink champagne, with Tim, again, getting belligerently drunk. Mark Proksch is introduced for the first time, doing impersonations of W. C. Fields and Charlie Chaplin.

Season 5
Tim moves to Jackson Hole, Wyoming, and buys a motorcycle to commute back and forth to Hollywood for the On Cinema taping. He becomes a proponent of 'simple living' and state rights, embracing his Republican values. Tim premieres his new show Decker, with Gregg initially angered by the fact Tim used footage of him without asking, although he later warms up to the role after positive fan feedback.

Tim announces that Ayaka has had an abortion, despite being opposed to that medical procedure. However, Gregg interviews Ayaka via Skype from Japan, revealing she gave birth and named the boy Tom Cruise Heidecker Junior, after the actor Tom Cruise. Ayaka moves back to America with Tom Cruise Junior, and into Gregg's apartment, after Tim denies paternity. This upsets Tim and he moves permanently to Jackson Hole, making Gregg host of the show.

Season 6
Gregg begins his first season as host, with a pre-recorded VHS tape of himself as the co-host. Tim returns as host in the second episode after he realized his new friends in Jackson Hole were white supremacists. He rekindles his relationship with Ayaka, and moves into Gregg's apartment with her and Tom Cruise Junior. In the season finale, Tim proposes to Ayaka and she accepts.

In the third Oscar Special, Peyton Reed comes on the Special to promote his new film Ant-Man and announces that Gregg has been cast as a minor character in the movie, which upsets Tim. In the finale segment, Gregg introduces James Dean, the former actor who was believed to be dead since 1955. Tim does not believe this is the real James Dean, leading to him verbally and physically threatening Dean before trashing the set.

Decker: Port of Call: Hawaii premieres during the season, with Tim and Gregg repeatedly traveling to Hawaii to shoot, exhausting them. Gregg accidentally spoils the planned ending, resulting in Tim shooting a new ending where he destroys all of Gregg's tapes. After this, Gregg leaves the show and plans to start his own.

Season 7
Gregg returns to the show after Tim promises to let him write, direct, produce the next season of Decker. He also moves to Victorville, California, and opens the Victorville Film Archives in a storage locker, where he also lives. Tim gives Ant-Man a rare one bag of popcorn which upsets Gregg, leading to him accusing Tim of paying $15,000 to have a minor role in the new Fantastic Four movie. Tim starts a rock band named Dekkar with a man named Axiom, and releases their debut single "Empty Bottle" on the show, annoying Gregg. Season 3 of Decker, titled Gregg Turkington's Decker vs. Dracula, is cancelled after three episodes after Tim lambasted Gregg for making a "mockery" of the franchise, irritating Gregg.

Gregg tells Tim that Dr. San, who Tim has been looking for since season four, is Ayaka's boss at her job. Tim storms off the set, set to confront him. However, in the next episode, both Tim and Dr. San forgive each other. Dr. San takes over as Tom Cruise Junior's new pediatric doctor. By the season seven finale, Tim announces that Tom Cruise Junior has died.

The fourth Oscar Special features periodic musical performances by Dekkar, much to the annoyance of Gregg. An animated rendering of Tom Cruise Junior as a young adult comes on stage, in which Tim and the animated Tom Cruise Junior come out against vaccination. Dr. San does a DNA test of James Dean, which proves that he is in fact, James Dean, angering Tim.

Season 8
The show moves to Victorville, where Tim has now moved into the storage unit with Gregg. Together, they buy an abandoned movie theater and open it as the "Victorville Film Center" where instead of playing new releases, a nightly showing from Gregg's VHS collection is played. Mark is hired as a concessions cashier.

Dr. San prescribes Tim a "nutritional vape system" in which Tim replaces all meals and food with an electronic cigarette full of supposed nutrients. Tim's physical condition worsens as he keeps using the vape, as he comes to the set sweating, bruised, hallucinating, and unfocused. Eventually, Tim goes to an actual doctor who informs him the vape and his blood are full of LSD, cocaine, and multiple other legal and illegal drugs. Tim quits the vape system and swears off Dr. San once again. Tim announces that Ayaka is pregnant with their second child. After Tim tries to get Ayaka to get an abortion, she leaves him and moves back to Japan. Tim begins a romantic relationship with Axiom's sister, Juliana.

A fire is started in the storage unit after Tim's vape pen overheats one night, burning the entire facility down, including the VFA. Tim suffers third degree burns on all of his body, including his face and hands. After insurance will not cover the cost of the fire, he returns to the show in bandages so he can keep working to pay for the damages and lawsuits, which exceed $1,000,000. Tim returns to a surprise intervention from Gregg, Joe Estevez, John Aprea, Mark, Ayaka, Ayaka's father, and Axiom, encouraging Tim to live a healthier life. Upset, he yells and kicks everyone but Axiom out. A remixed version of "Empty Bottle" ("MT BTL 2.0") is released after Tim retools Dekkar into an electronic band known as DKR.

Season 9
Tim moves back to Hollywood and opens "Six Bag Cinemas", a new movie theater with recliner chairs and a waiter (Mark) that brings food to customers during the movie. The Victorville Film Center is burned down, with Gregg suggesting that Tim burned it down for insurance money. Tim's skin dies after he stops using facial cream for his burns. Needing a skin transplant, Tim chooses Manuel from DKR to donate skin off of his lower back and buttocks for Tim's face and left hand.

Tim hosts the Electric Sun Desert Music Festival in Apple Valley, California, where Dr. San gave out free samples of his vape system, resulting in 20 deaths and over 100 injuries. Tim and Dr. San are arrested and jailed on murder and manslaughter charges. Gregg takes over as host with Mark as his co-host, and spend two episodes disparaging Tim. Tim returns on bail, and with his lawyer, Doug Lyman, pin the 20 deaths on Dr. San and the Apple Valley authorities who did not respond in time. However, Dr. San commits suicide in jail, so the relatives of the 20 who died now primarily blame Tim for the deaths. At the end of the season, Tim tells Gregg that, no matter what happens next, he will never forget what he said about him on the show.

The Trial
Tim is put on trial for the death of the "Electric Sun 20". Frustrated with his attorney Mark Dwyer, Tim decides to represent himself and proceeds to threaten the prosecution led by Vincent Rosetti and its witnesses and falsify evidence. Tim is issued multiple contempt citations. Nicholas Meyer, director of Star Trek II and co-writer for Star Trek IV, appears as one of the witnesses in an attempt by Tim to settle the San Francisco Star Trek argument with Gregg. Ultimately, Tim is found not guilty for only one of the 20 deaths, as that victim died of a heroin overdose. A mistrial is called for the remaining 19, due to a hung jury with 11 guilty and 1 not guilty verdicts.

Season X 
During the fifth Oscar Special, Mark is locked tight into a standard diving dress while doing an impression of Matt Hooper from Jaws, being hospitalized for asphyxiation. Tim revamps On Cinema with a new intro and set, along with its first sponsor: Rio Jenesis, a protein shake company that creates a "germ shield" that Tim drinks. Gregg announces that he has resurrected the VFA, which appears to now be several bins full of VHS tapes stocked in Mark's hospital room, and has started collecting and wearing movie promotional hats to Tim's vocal displeasure. Episodes 4 through 6 were filmed in 360-degree video.

Tim faces a civil suit from one of the families of the "Electric Sun 19". His assets, including On Cinema and Decker, are being seized and he claims he might soon be facing bankruptcy. With help from his attorney Mark Dwyer, Tim manages to convince the family of one of the victims, the Delgados, to let him try to earn money for them with his various assets. The Delgado Media Holdings company is created and they hire Gregg as the managing editor, giving him creative control. Gregg's role quickly increases to that of host, while Tim's role was diminished to announcer. In the season finale, an irate Tim destroys the set, insults the Delgados, and announces his campaign for district attorney of San Bernardino County against the incumbent Vincent Rosetti.

Feature film 

In July 2019, it was announced that Magnolia Pictures was going to release a feature film called Mister America, based on the On Cinema universe. The movie focuses on the storyline about Tim's failed campaign to become District Attorney for San Bernardino County between seasons 10 and 11 and introduces Toni Newman, the lone juror who voted not guilty at Tim's trial, who becomes Tim's campaign manager. The film was directed by Eric Notarnicola and debuted on October 4, 2019 at Beyondfest, held at Grauman's Egyptian Theatre.

Season 11 
The sixth Oscar Special is produced by Delgado Media Holdings and hosted by new arrival Rafael Torres, though Gregg otherwise is in charge of the show. Tim eventually invades the broadcasting studio to take back control of the special and to promote conspiracy theories from QAnon, and manages to erase Gregg's video tape collection with the help of a magnetic vest. Mark, still comatose, is used by Gregg as a "living Oscar". Tim later resuscitates Mark by accidentally knocking him over.

Delgado Media Holdings is sold back to Tim with the help of a suspicious online banking website called MoneyZap. Tim is quickly hit with debt from the Delgados' company (now renamed HEI Inc.), a lawsuit from Rafael Torres, and substantial cash owed to MoneyZap, which has interest rates on its loans exceeding 300%. Toni Newman joins HEI Inc. as its chief financial officer along with board members Joe Estevez, Axiom, Manuel, and militant conspiracy theorist Michael "LaRue" Matthews. LaRue joins Dekkar and they release a third version of "Empty Bottle", with rap lyrics warning of the deep state. On advice from Toni, Tim disbands Dekkar and fires Joe Estevez from HEI Inc. At the end of the season, Tim announces that he and Toni have married.

Gregg also starts his Mobile VFA, which consists of him simply selling his old VHS tapes on the flea market. Later, he starts up a VFA Classic Movie program, where he sells public domain movies with commentary dubbed over the originals. Gregg bundles the original A Star Is Born with the 2018 adaptation, which gets Mark arrested for bootlegging. Mark gets put into a coma again while in prison, and goes missing after being discharged from the hospital.

Season 12 
In the seventh Oscar Special, Tim annulls his marriage to Toni, in order to stage a more elaborate second wedding with her at the special. Gregg arrives at the wedding dressed as the Joker, driving his car housing the Mobile VFA onto the set and promoting his planned celebration of the 40th anniversary of the film Arthur in 2021. Gregg leaves his car running throughout the special, causing the entire production crew and wedding party to fall unconscious to carbon monoxide poisoning, leading to two deaths.

The show moves from Adult Swim to HEI Network, a subscription streaming service created by Tim, in early 2021. Tim and Gregg host separate Oscar specials in 2021. Tim hosts his show with Toni, in a studio similar to that of a talk show, while Gregg hosts his special independently in the Mobile VFA. Tim reluctantly calls Gregg after being dissatisfied with Axiom's movie knowledge and invites him onto his show. Footage is shown of Mark swearing off both Tim and Gregg. Gregg storms off set after LaRue declares him guilty for the deaths from the last special, gets back in his car, and runs over LaRue after he gets in the way, handicapping him. Gregg sells off the VFA to Tim in exchange for no charges being pressed.

Between seasons, HEI Network released the pilot to "Rock House", a reality show starring Axiom, Manuel, and Wendy Kerby, a singer from Tim and Toni's church introduced in the prior Oscar special. HEI Network also launches its own cryptocurrency, HEI Points, with the intent to replace the United States dollar by 2022.

Season 12 starts with a new intro, theme, and set. Toni, drunk at her birthday party, has an affair with Axiom at the "Rock House". Toni goes to rehab for her drinking problems while Axiom is kicked out of Dekkar. The band is renamed to D4, with Wendy joining. Toni is released from rehab and tells Tim she is leaving him, confessing that she knew he was guilty during the Electric Sun 20 trial and was a heavy alcoholic for the entire time she had known Tim. Mark is again spotted by a fan, this time performing as Spider-Man on a street in Hollywood. Tim convinces Mark to return, doing a pilot called "Mark's Cavalcade of Characters". Gregg reveals that he is working with Joe on a new movie, Deck of Cards, focusing on "the original Joker", the playing card. Other pilots are made, including LaRue's "Xposed" and Gregg's "Popcorn Shuffle", with "Xposed" being chosen for a full season of its own.

Tim and Wendy Kerby host a Valentine's Day special in 2022. After an awkward staged sketch where Tim tries to instigate a kiss between Wendy and Manuel, she becomes uncomfortable and abruptly leaves, leaving D4 is unable to perform. Manuel convinces Tim to patch things up with Axiom, and the three give an impromptu Dekkar reunion.

Season 13 
The ninth Oscar Special takes place at the planned site of the HEI Ranch, Tim's proposed business and media center, located on a remote stretch of land near Apple Valley, California. Little work has been done, with construction vehicles everywhere and the water brown and dirty. Gregg unveils the VFA Tour Bus, made from a hastily remodeled bus. G. Amato, a financial backer who also has more HEI Points than anyone else, is introduced. The cast and crew are harassed by locals who drive dirt bikes on set, point rifle lasers, sabotage the power from the generator, and ultimately fire upon the crew at the end of the special. Gregg evacuates everyone in his tour bus except for Tim, who stays behind and confronts the locals. Tim gets injured and was ordered to remain away from the stretch of land.

Deck of Cards released on September 2, 2022, albeit heavily edited by Tim, making a program similar to Decker. Season 13 debuted October 26, with the program being retooled into a morning show titled On Cinema! and More in the Morning. Kaili Amato now co-hosts, with The Amato Group providing funding and the new venue. Kaili and Tim expand the focus from films to social media and Hollywood in general, with Gregg still around for movie discussion. A Dekkar reunion tour goes awry when their tour bus, the VFA Tour Bus, rolls into a ditch late at night, injuring Tim, blinding Axiom, and leaving Manuel unconscious for weeks. When Manuel gains consciousness again, he is unable to understand English. Both of them heal by the time the tenth Oscar Special airs.

After the crash, Tim starts drinking the brown grain water at the HEI Ranch, which contains lithium and other materials, claiming the water is healing him, despite it frequently making him throw up. Tim has a doctor lethally inject him in order to prove the grain water unlocks immortality, although his heart remains beating, he remained unconscious and had to be hospitalized. After two weeks, Tim is released only to find out that his trailer at the HEI Ranch, with all of his personal belongings, was removed. Attempts to contact Axiom, Manuel, and G. Amato fail. Gregg offers to let Tim stay at his house, with Tim accepting and thanking him for being a friend.

Season 14 
The tenth Oscar Special pays tribute to Gregg and 10 years of his movie expertise, complete with musical numbers and a set themed around him and his past work. Tim's initial support and praise of Gregg turns sour once G. Amato offers Tim a new place to stay and more financial backing for upcoming projects, calling him a second son. G. Amato gives both Tim and Gregg funding for new movies, Baboon from Tim and a Pep Boys film from Gregg, both set to star Mark. Gregg launches the VFN, a streaming network for classic films. The service, consisting of a Dropbox folder, accidentally included dashcam footage of the VFA Tour Bus crash, which appears to show Tim intentionally swerving the car off the ditch in a suicide attempt. The footage spreads to Twitter and eventually to the people on set. Tim, fully dressed as Pinocchio for a planned scene, plays the footage on set. Axiom and Manuel swiftly leave afterward, leaving Tim to have a violent, emotional breakdown with only G. Amato, dressed as Geppetto, consoling him.

Production
Heidecker has stated that On Cinema was started out of a desire to mock the podcasting community. The first episode was recorded on the set of The Comedy, where Heidecker and Turkington were working together, after Heidecker proposed the idea between takes. In April 2017, On Cinema initiated a Patreon page for funding, most of it going to the Oscar specials, with some of the higher options including receiving producer credits, walk-on roles for the Oscar specials, or live custom Skype reviews from Gregg Turkington.

In 2013, the On Cinema Film Guide app was released, featuring the voices of Turkington and Heidecker reviewing over 17,000 films.

The series moved premieres to Adult Swim's online live streams in 2017, with the series continuing to be posted on YouTube on a delay. The Adult Swim streams later picked up a fan-show series, Big Unhappy Family, in 2019, as a companion to season 11 and Mister America. However, in late 2020, following the COVID-19 pandemic and layoffs that shuttered the Adult Swim streams, it was announced that the show would move from Adult Swim's platforms to HEI Network, an independent streaming service created for the series.

Reception
The show has a dedicated cult following of fans who interact with the storylines via social media, often taking sides as "GreggHeads" or "TimHeads" in the frequent personal conflicts between the hosts which are often only tangentially, if at all, related to films or cinema. During the annual live Oscar special, Tim and Gregg both frequently provide interactive elements via online polls for fans to vote on. This cult following is especially found on YouTube, Facebook, and Twitter, the latter through Gregg and Tim's respective profiles, of which Gregg has completely devoted to the persona of his alter-ego. Heidecker and Turkington have also appeared in character on the podcasts Kreative Kontrol with Vish Khanna and The Best Show in 2015 and 2017.

Heidecker and Turkington also started Decker-Con, where new episodes of Decker are shown to fans and the cast appears as their On Cinema characters to field questions.

For "The Trial", Heidecker and Turkington upended the traditional review aspect of the series, and staged an elaborate mock event where Tim's character was on trial for murder, which lasted over a week. It received acclaim from observers, some of whom called it "brilliant" and "ambitious."

Touring 

In 2018 and 2019, Heidecker and Turkington initiated a nationwide On Cinema Live! tour with special guests from the On Cinema/Decker universe such as Joe Estevez and John C. Reilly, the band Dekkar and special content created only for the tour, such as live reviewing various major release films, including Superfly, Mission: Impossible – Fallout, Jurassic World: Fallen Kingdom, Sicario: Day of the Soldado, Ant Man & The Wasp.

References

External links

On Cinema podcast first website via Tumblr (no longer maintained)
On Cinema at the Cinema episodes via YouTube
Dekkar band site (redirects to Adult Swim's Decker webpage)
Tim Heidecker District Attorney campaign site
On Cinema Timeline
HEI Network website

Adult Swim original programming
2011 podcast debuts
2012 web series debuts
2013 podcast endings
Works about film
Film criticism television series
Film and television podcasts
Comedy and humor podcasts
YouTube original programming
American comedy web series
American satire
Parodies
Satirical websites
Cultural depictions of W. C. Fields
Cultural depictions of The Three Stooges